"Todavía" is a song by Cruz Martínez y Los Super Reyes. It is the second single from the album Cumbia con Soul (2009). It was released on October 16, 2009. An EP was released on the Mexican iTunes Store on November 11, 2009.

Track listing
Mexican iTunes EP
 "Todavía" – 3:48
 "Todavía (Radio Version)" – 3:48
 "Todavía (Super Banda Version)" – 4:21
 "Todavía (Acappelas Bcks DJ Remixer Version 2)" – 3:54
 "Todavía (Acappelas Lds DJ Remixer Version 1)" – 3:54

Personnel
 Written by Cruz Martínez and Juan Paulo Hernández
 Produced by Cruz Martínez
 Lead vocals by Pangie and Abel Talamántez

External links
 "Todavía" (Music Video) at YouTube

References

2009 songs
2009 singles
Los Super Reyes songs
Songs written by Cruz Martínez
Song recordings produced by Cruz Martínez
Warner Music Latina singles